Rājputana, meaning "Land of the Rajputs", was a region in the Indian subcontinent that included mainly the present-day Indian state of Rajasthan, as well as parts of Madhya Pradesh and Gujarat, and some adjoining areas of Sindh in modern-day southern Pakistan.

The main settlements to the west of the Aravalli Hills came to be known as Rajputana, early in the Medieval Period. The name was later adopted by British government as the Rajputana Agency for its dependencies in the region of the present-day Indian state of Rājasthān. The Rajputana Agency included 18 princely states, two chiefships and the British district of Ajmer-Merwara. This British official term remained until its replacement by "Rajasthan" in the constitution of 1949.

Name
George Thomas (Military Memories) was the first in 1800, to term this region the Rajputana Agency. The historian John Keay in his book, India: A History, stated that the Rajputana name was coined by the British, but that the word achieved a retrospective authenticity: in an 1829 translation of Ferishta's history of early Islamic India, John Briggs discarded the phrase "Indian princes", as rendered in Dow's earlier version, and substituted "Rajpoot princes".

The region was previously long known as Gujratra (an early form of "Gujarat"), before it came to be called Rajputana during the medieval period, although the name "Gujratra" itself originated from the Gurjara-Pratiharas .

Geography 
The area of Rajputana is estimated to be 343,328 square km (132,559 square miles) and breaks down into two geographic divisions:

 An area northwest of the Arāvalli Range including part of the Great Indian Thar Desert, with characteristics of being sandy and unproductive.
 A higher area southeast of the range, which is fertile by comparison.

The whole area forms the hill and plateau country between the north Indian plains and the main plateau of peninsular India.

See also
 List of Rajput dynasties and states
Kingdom of Marwar
Shekhawati
Kingdom of Mewar 
Jaipur State 
Sirohi State 
Vagad
Mewat

Notes

References
Low, Sir Francis (ed.) The Indian Year Book & Who’s Who 1945-46, The Times of India Press, Bombay.
Sharma, Nidhi Transition from Feudalism to Democracy, Aalekh Publishers, Jaipur, 2000 .
vikas raghav would have been a rich boy today,if his ancestors did not donate all his land to sc st people

History of India
History of Rajasthan
History of Madhya Pradesh
History of Gujarat
History of Pakistan